Kill Decision is a science fiction novel by Daniel Suarez, published in 2012. It deals with themes of espionage, artificial intelligence, and warfare using robots and drones. The story deals with the fictional scenario where insurgents have created automated drones that identify enemies and make the decision to kill them (the "kill decision") without human intervention.

Characters 
 Odin aka David Shaw: The leader of the main protagonist team of the book. 
 Linda McKinney aka The Professor: A professor who studies swarming models of Weaver ants. She was targeted by the insurgents for her computer model of the swarming behaviour of ants, and was rescued by Odin's team
 Huginn and Muninn: Two ravens trained by Odin to do surveillance.
 Foxy: Team member, handles flying helicopters, planes, etc.
 Ripper, Mooch and Smokey: Team members.
 Hoov, a team member specializing in communications and audio visual forgery detection.
 Ritter: An American who is part of the group that wants drones to be legalized and funded; tries to subvert the plans of the group.
 Henry Clarke: A person who manages social media messaging for the armed forces and the US Government.
 Marta: Henry's boss.

Plot summary 
The book opens with a video feed from predator drones in Karbala, Iraq, where it is observed that an unmarked drone with American colors fires a missile on the dense crowd during a religious ceremony, killing many people. Repercussions of this attack are felt worldwide.

A team at the vision lab in Stanford are informed by a patent lawyer that their computer vision code has been stolen by some people and appears in public forums. One of the students then traces the code, and observes that it initially appeared in a location in China. Just as they assemble the team to discuss this development, they are killed by a laser guided missile.

Linda McKinney is studying the swarming behavior of weaver ants in Africa. Later that night, Linda is woken up by some noises, and is lured away from her house just as her house is completely destroyed in a missile attack. She is then sedated and kidnapped by Odin and his crew. On the way back to the US, we observe a military operation in Pakistan to reverse engineer US predator drones. Odin realizes that it is a farce put up to implicate Pakistan for the attack at Karbala, and decides to stick to his original plan. They land in Kansas City, and then make their way to the base of operations, which is located in SubTropolis, an old limestone mine.

Linda manages to escape the base in a Fire truck. She seeks protection of the FBI from the people who have 'kidnapped' her. Ritter, claiming to be from the Department of Homeland Security turns up and takes her into custody. Ritter is unable to convince Odin to step down on his mission to prevent the widespread adoption of unmanned kill-drones. Odin takes charge of Linda again. Odin realizes that his base of operations has been compromised. They execute their mission quickly, which is to capture one of the automated drones in Northern Utah. They manage to capture a drone just before it self-destructs, but then their plane is targeted by missiles. The team jumps off with parachutes and lands safely. Odin and Linda make their way to another base in Colorado. Soon after they land, they find that their communication has been tapped. Suddenly, Hoov is killed by a sniper, and they are attacked by many automated drones. The team barely manages to escape in a plane, but sustains many injuries in the process.

Odin and their team take sanctuary in Mexico, where they meet up with Mouse. Linda and Odin fall in love with each other. They sneak back into the US, and then they meet up with Mordecai, who tells them about Henry Clarke. Odin infiltrates Henry Clarke's workspace, and intimidates him and his superior, Marta, into giving him information about the location of the pheromone making site, which is in Pakistan. The team reach Pakistan and find that a very large shipment of pheromone-making chemicals was indeed shipped there, but most of it has been processed and shipped off. They also find evidence of larger drones that can perform specialized tasks.

They go to a shipyard in China where they inspect shipping boxes. They discover that a large shipment of drones have been transported via the ship Ebba Maersk, in a path that will intercept an American navy ship. The complete destruction of the ship by the drones will probably convince the government to fund the companies building the drones. Odin is temporarily stopped by Ritter, but they manage to take Ritter into custody. They try to fly a helicopter towards the Ebba Maersk, but find that their fuel is probably insufficient to reach it. They land on a ship carrying BMW cars, Tonsberg, and hijack it. They release the crew of the ship, but convince the captain that to help them.

Linda proposes a plan of spraying themselves with pheromones so that the drones think of them as friendly entities. Using this as a cover, Odin, Foxy and Linda manage to land on the Ebba Maersk and maneuver the ship away from the navy ship and towards a rocky island. Just as they are about to escape, their supply of friendly pheromones runs out. Odin creates a diversion by throwing a canister of attack pheromones on the opposite side of the ship, and they make it out safely. The team returns to the United States, and are commended for their actions by their superior. Linda meets her father, and introduces Odin to him. Henry quits his job just as Marta's car is hit by a missile.

References

External links

 Novels' website
2012 science fiction novels
2012 American novels
Techno-thriller novels
Novels about computing
Military science fiction novels
Novels about artificial intelligence
Drones in fiction
Hive minds in fiction
Dutton Penguin books